Vladyslav Arturovych Krykliy (born 23 November 1986) is a Ukrainian economist, civil servant and politician. From 29 August 2019 to 18 May 2021 he served as Minister of Infrastructure of Ukraine.

Biography 
Krykliy studied at the Taras Shevchenko National University of Kyiv (2009). Candidate of Economic Sciences (2015).

From 2002 to 2008, he served as the head of the stock market securities department at Interbank. From 2008 to 2010, Krykliy worked at the Astrum Investment Management company. From 2011 to 2013, he was a director of Cinema Theater LLC.

From 2014 to 2015, Krykliy worked as an adviser to the Minister of Internal Affairs. Head of the Main Service Center of the Ministry of Internal Affairs.

Krykliy was on a party list of the Servant of the People political party during the 2019 parliamentary elections, yet himself is not a registered member of the party (non-partisan, according to the Central Election Commission). Krykliy was elected to the Verkhovna Rada (the Ukrainian parliament) in 2019. He surrendered his deputy mandate upon his ministerial appointment on 29 August 2019.

On 29 August 2019, Krykliy was appointed Minister of Infrastructure of Ukraine.

On 14 May 2021, Krykliy offered his resignation as Minister, according to a source of UNIAN he was denounced for leading a "shadow back office" in the ministry, allegedly working in the interests of the chairman of the Verkhovna Rada transport committee, . On 18 May 2021, parliament dismissed Krykliy as Minister.

See also 
 Honcharuk Government
 List of members of the parliament of Ukraine, 2019–24

References

External links 

 

1986 births
Living people
Politicians from Kyiv
Taras Shevchenko National University of Kyiv alumni
21st-century Ukrainian economists
Ukrainian civil servants
Ninth convocation members of the Verkhovna Rada
Infrastructure ministers of Ukraine
Servant of the People (political party) politicians
21st-century Ukrainian politicians